Kobol is a musical duo from Ensenada, Baja California, Mexico, formed by Ignacio Chávez and Argel Cota- Arhkota. They define their music as "a mixture of jazzy natural low tempo beats, freestyle DSP jams, sly acoustic impressions with dubby vibes".

Discography

Albums
Centipede (Jan, 2013)
Broken Ebony (Oct, 2005)
Extempore (Nov, 2007)

Remixes

External links
Official site
Static Discos

Musical groups from Ensenada, Baja California
Mexican electronic musical groups
Mexican musical duos